The Celebrity Apprentice Australia is a celebrity version of The Apprentice Australia series. It began to air on the Nine Network on 24 October 2011, with the founder and chairman of Wizard Home Loans, Mark Bouris, returning as the chief executive officer. Brad Seymore and Deborah Thomas acted as boardroom advisors. The series is narrated by Andrew Daddo. Comedian Julia Morris was the inaugural celebrity winner, defeating choreographer and So You Think You Can Dance Australia judge Jason Coleman in the final boardroom.

Candidates
The following is the list of candidates for this season.

Weekly results

 The candidate was on the losing team.
 The candidate won the competition and was named the Celebrity Apprentice.
 The candidate won as project manager on his/her team.
 The candidate lost as project manager on his/her team.
 The candidate was brought to the final boardroom.
 The candidate was fired.
 The candidate lost as project manager and was fired.
 The candidate was absent during the week due to previous engagements.

Challenges
Unlike the original series showing one episode a week, including the final boardroom. The Celebrity Apprentice is aired five nights a week. In this show's format, the tasks were aired every Mondays and Wednesdays, the losing team's boardrooms (including the firing) were aired on Tuesdays and Thursdays, and the behind the scenes (including the celebrity giving a cheque to their chosen charity) were aired on Fridays.

Task 1
Airdate: 24 October 2011 (Task) and 25 October 2011 (Boardroom)

Task 2

Airdate: 26 October 2011 (Task) and 27 October 2011 (Boardroom)

Task 3

Airdate: 31 October 2011 (Task) and 1 November 2011 (Boardroom)

Task 4

Airdate: 2 November 2011 (Task) and 3 November 2011 (Boardroom)

Task 5

Airdate: 7 November 2011 (Task) and 8 November 2011 (Boardroom)

Task 6

Airdate: 9 November 2011 (Task and Boardroom)

Task 7

Airdate: 14 November 2011 (Task) and 15 November 2011 (Boardroom)

Task 8 (Finale)

Airdate: 16 November 2011 (Final Task) & 21 November 2011 (Final Task, boardroom and winner announcement)

Reception

Ratings

Notes
Upon the disapproval of Mr. Bouris, the female team changed their team name from "Bouris' Babes" to "Ignite" following the first challenge.
Lisa was absent from the fifth challenge due to previous engagements, therefore she replaced in the challenge by fired contestant Warwick.
Didier and Max were fired simultaneously in the boardroom following the fifth challenge, and with no difference in challenge wins, Didier's success as project manager in the third challenge places him higher than Max's failure as project manager in the first challenge.
Shane and Jesinta were fired simultaneously in the boardroom following the eighth challenge, with Jesinta's four challenge wins placing her higher than Shane's three wins.
In overnight figures, the rankings for the "Monday" segment of "Celebrity Challenge #7" (– approx.) in the three target demographics were as follows: 25–54 (#4), 18–49 (#4) and 16–39 (#4).
In overnight figures, the rankings for the "Challenge" segment of "Celebrity Challenge #7" (– approx.) in the three target demographics were as follows: 25–54 (#3), 18–49 (#3) and 16–39 (#3).
In overnight figures, the rankings for "Boardroom and... 'You're Fired' #7" in the three target demographics were as follows: 25–54 (#4), 18–49 (#5) and 16–39 (#4).
In overnight figures, the rankings for the "Wednesday" segment of "Celebrity Challenge #8" (– approx.) in the three target demographics were as follows: 25–54 (#5), 18–49 (#5) and 16–39 (#5).
In overnight figures, the rankings for the "Challenge" segment of "Celebrity Challenge #8" (– approx.) in the three target demographics were as follows: 25–54 (#2), 18–49 (#2) and 16–39 (#1).
The "Grand Final" episode, which aired on 21 November 2011, was split into three parts: "Challenge", "Boardroom" and "Winner Announced".
In overnight figures, the rankings for the "Boardroom" segment of the "Grand Final" episode in the three target demographics were as follows: 25–54 (#5), 18–49 (#5) and 16–39 (#5).
In overnight figures, the rankings for the "Winner Announced" segment of the "Grand Final" episode in the three target demographics were as follows: 25–54 (#1), 18–49 (#1) and 16–39 (#1).

References

Australia 1
2011 Australian television seasons